The Girl Cow Puncher's Sweetheart is an American silent film, a western produced by Kalem Company and directed by Sidney Olcott with Gene Gauntier in the leading role.

Cast
 Gene Gauntier –

External links

 The Cow Puncher's Sweetheart website dedicated to Sidney Olcott

1910 films
Silent American drama films
American silent short films
Films directed by Sidney Olcott
1910 short films
1910 drama films
American black-and-white films
1910s American films